Timeless is the fourth solo studio album by Canadian country singer Dallas Smith, and was released through 604 Records on August 28, 2020.

Background
Smith told Parton and Pearl after releasing The Fall, "I honestly just looked at that chunk of music as something individually". He then began to work on a second EP when he "got a sense of the record taking shape". Smith said "As far as a record and listening to it front to back I knew what was missing and how I wanted this chapter to be represented".

While Smith recorded the vocals of the previously-released tracks in Nashville, Tennessee with longtime producer Joey Moi, restrictions due to the COVID-19 pandemic forced Smith to record vocals for the rest of the album at his home in Langley, British Columbia. Smith said he hoped to release "timeless country music" in "uncertain times".

Content
The album contains twelve songs in total and includes all six songs from his previously released, Juno Award-nominated extended play, The Fall. Five singles: "Make 'Em Like You", "Rhinestone World", "Drop", "Timeless", and "Like a Man" were released prior to the album and each one reached number one on the Billboard Canada Country chart, breaking a record that Smith previously set for most number ones on a Canadian country album with his third album, Side Effects. The album features collaborations with fellow Canadian country artists Dean Brody and MacKenzie Porter as well as American country rock artist Hardy. The latter collaboration, "Some Things Never Change" was sent to country radio as the sixth single off the album, and would extend Smith's record to six number one singles from the same album.

Track listing

Personnel
Adapted from the CD booklet.

Steve Marc Antonio - recording
Case Arnold - background vocals
Jeff Balding - recording
Dean Brody - featured vocals on "Friends Don't Let Friends Drink Alone"
Tyler Chiarelli - electric guitar
Dave Cohen - production, keys, programming
Scott Cooke - editing
Kris Donegan - electric guitar
Matt Dragstrem - programming
Paul Franklin - steel guitar
David Garcia - production, programming
Ally Gecewitz - studio assistance, editing
Hardy - featured vocals on "Some Things Never Change", background vocals
Wes Hightower - background vocals
Mark Hill - bass guitar
Mark Holman - programming
Chris Hornbuckle - photography
Annette Kirk - art design
Tori Johnson - art direction
Joey Moi - production, background vocals, programming
Andrew Mendelson - mastering
Luke Mosley - keys
Eivind Norland - editing, mixing
Justin Ostrander - electric guitar
MacKenzie Porter - featured vocals on "Friends Don't Let Friends Drink Alone"
Jerry Roe - drums, percussion
Justin Schipper - banjo, dobro, steel guitar
Adam Shoenfeld - electric guitar
Jimmie Lee Sloas - bass guitar
Dallas Smith - lead vocals, background vocals
Ilya Toshinsky - acoustic guitar, banjo, mandolin, resonator guitar
Derek Wells - electric guitar
Nir Z - drums, percussion

Chart performance

Album

Singles

Certifications

Awards and nominations

Release history

References

2020 albums
Dallas Smith albums
604 Records albums
Albums produced by Joey Moi